The CMLL Torneo Nacional de Parejas Increíbles 2014 or "National Incredible Pairs Tournament 2014" was the fifth of a series of Lucha Libre (professional wrestling) tournaments for tag teams traditionally held early in the year. The tournament was based on the Lucha Libre Parejas Increíbles match type where two wrestlers of opposite allegiance, portraying either villains, referred to as "Rudos" in Lucha Libre wrestling terminology, or fan favorites, or "Technicos". At times some of the team members were part of pre-existing scripted feuds or storylines with each other. The tournament was won by the team of Atlantis and Euforia, marking the fourth time Atlantis has won the tournament.

Tournament
Consejo Mundial de Lucha Libre (CMLL) held their fourth annual Torneo Nacional De Parejas Increíbles tournament between March 7 and March 21, 2014, starting with two opening round groups where the winner of each group will advance to the finals. The finals took place at the 2014 Homenaje a Dos Leyendas, which was the only tournament match contested under best two-out-of-three falls rules. The tournament featured teams of wrestlers who would not usually team up, in fact most of the teams were on opposite sides of the Tecnico/Rudo (Fan favorite/villain) divide and were oftentimes direct rivals.

Tournament participants
Key

Block A (March 7, 2014)
Místico  and Reaper 
Titán  and El Felino 
Maximo  and Rey Escorpión 
Rey Cometa  and Pólvora 
La Sombra  and Último Guerrero 
Valiente  and Vangelis 
Volador Jr.  and Averno 
La Máscara  and Ephesto 

Block B (March 11, 2014)
Atlantis  and Euforia 
Stuka Jr.  and Niebla Roja 
Marco Corleone  and El Terrible 
Máscara Dorada  and Mephisto 
Blue Panther  and Negro Casas 
Delta  and Mr. Águila 
Diamante Azul  and Rey Bucanero 
Brazo de Plata  and Kráneo

Tournament results

References

2014 in professional wrestling
CMLL Torneo Nacional de Parejas Increibles